Gaetano Cecere, (November 26, 1894 – 1985) is an American sculptor. He was born, educated and worked in New York City.  He studied with Hermon A MacNeil, with work in the Museum of Modern Art in New York City, and Gaetano, known as "Guy," attended the Beaux-Arts Institute of Design and the National Academy of Design.  In 1920 he won the Prix de Rome and studied at the American Academy in Rome for several years. During this period a "tendency to simplify forms for decorative effects was developed." Cecere has works and documents housed in many major museums and collections, including the Smithsonian Institution, the "National Collection of Fine Arts" and the Archives of American Art".

He was a member of the National Sculpture Society.

Cecere sculpted the plaster model for the first version of the Distinguished Service Cross and later designed the Soldier's Medal.

Selected works

Eighth issue of the Society of Medalists No Easy Way from Earth to Stars, 1933.
Abraham Lincoln Memorial "larger than life" (10" 6") bronze statue, Milwaukee, Wisconsin, War Memorial Plaza, 1934
 1939 New York World's Fair,  two monumental statues representing American Manhood and American Womanhood  1939
 USPO, Great Neck, New York, Large carved in stone American Eagle,1940
 U.S. Capitol, United States House of Representatives Chambers and rotunda, bas relief portraits of famous lawmakers Alphonso X, "the Wise", George Mason, Simon de Montfort and Justinian, 1949-50
 Smithsonian Institution collection
 Metropolitan Museum of Art, New York
 Whitney Museum of American Art, New York
 Norfolk Museum of Art
 Brookgreen Gardens, published featured artist,1938
 National Collection of Fine Art, Smithsonian Institution
 Former Federal Reserve Bank of Atlanta Jacksonville Branch entryway reliefs

References
Catell Press,1970 ed. American Artists
AskArt.com/Gaetano Cecere
American Academy, Rome, Italy
americanart.si.edu/collections/search...
www.si.edu/collections/collection

External links
 American Manhood and American Womanhood, 1939 World's Fair

1894 births
1985 deaths
20th-century American sculptors
American male sculptors
National Sculpture Society members
Federal Art Project artists
Beaux-Arts Institute of Design (New York City) alumni
20th-century American male artists
Sculptors from New York (state)
Artists from New York City